The 1952 Australia rugby union tour of New Zealand was a series of 10 rugby union matches played by "Wallabies" in 1952.

The test series was won tied with a victory for Australia and one for New Zealand

Matches 

Scores and results list Australia's points tally first.

Bibliography 
 

Australia national rugby union team tours of New Zealand
Australian Rugby Union
New Zealand Rugby Union